Xiu Lijuan (修丽娟, Pinyin: Xiū Lì-juān, born 26 October 1957) is a Chinese former basketball player who competed in the 1984 Summer Olympics.

References

1957 births
Living people
Chinese women's basketball players
Basketball players from Jilin
Basketball players at the 1984 Summer Olympics
Medalists at the 1984 Summer Olympics
Olympic basketball players of China
Olympic bronze medalists for China
Olympic medalists in basketball
Basketball players at the 1982 Asian Games
Asian Games medalists in basketball
Asian Games gold medalists for China
Medalists at the 1982 Asian Games
Manchu sportspeople